Land of the Damned is the debut album by American heavy metal/glam metal band Diamond Rexx. It was released by Island Records in 1986, and is the band's sole major label release. It was reissued in 2007 by Crash Music Inc. and in 2008 by Massacre Poland. A video was made for "Wish I Was Rich" .

Track listing
All tracks by S. St. Lust, Nasti Habits, and Dave Andre, except where noted.
 "Land of the Damned" – 3:13 (Lust, Habits)
 "All I Need" – 3:07 (Johnny Cottone, Habits, Lust)
 "Cuz I Wancha" – 3:13 (Lust, Habits)
 "Wish I Was Rich" – 3:47
 "Don't Start Without Me" – 4:01 (Lust, Habits)
 "Up and Down" – 3:10 (Lust, Habits)
 "Rock Gun" – 4:02
 "B.A.T.S." – 4:41
 "Kick in Your Face" – 3:31
 "Life and Death" – 3:18

Personnel

The band
 Nasti Habits – Lead vocals
 S. St. Lust – Guitar, backing vocals
 Dave Andre – Guitar, backing vocals
 Johnny Cottone – Drums, backing vocals

Crew
 Billy Cafero
 Chris Johnson
 Billy Johnson
 Lynn Drake

Production
 Mark Nawara – Producer
 Roger Heiss – Engineer
 Roy Montroy – Assistant engineer
 Denny Nowak – Mixing
 Larry Bishop – Production assistant

References

1986 albums
Diamond Rexx albums
Island Records albums